The Chinese Parrot (1927) is a silent film, the second in the Charlie Chan series. It was directed by Paul Leni and starred Japanese actor Sōjin Kamiyama as Chan. The film is an adaptation of the 1926 Earl Derr Biggers novel The Chinese Parrot. It is considered a lost film.
Another version of the story was filmed in 1934, entitled The Courage of Charlie Chan.

Cast
Marian Nixon as Sally Phillmore
Florence Turner as Mrs. Phillmore
Hobart Bosworth as P.J. Madden
Edmund Burns as Robert Eden
Albert Conti as Martin Thorne
Sōjin Kamiyama as Charlie Chan
Fred Esmelton as Alexander Eden
Edgar Kennedy as Maydorf
George Kuwa as Louis Wong
Slim Summerville as Prospector
 Dan Mason as Prospector
Anna May Wong as Nautch Dancer
Etta Lee as Girl in Gambling Den
Jack Trent as Jordan
Frank Toy as number one son

References

External links
 
 
 

1927 films
American silent feature films
American black-and-white films
Charlie Chan films
Fictional parrots
Films based on mystery novels
Films directed by Paul Leni
Lost American films
Universal Pictures films
1927 mystery films
Films based on American novels
1927 lost films
1920s American films
Silent mystery films
Silent thriller films
Silent American comedy films